Ruggles-Brise is a surname. Notable people include:
Dorothea Ruggles-Brise (1866–1937), Scottish folk song collector
Edward Ruggles-Brise (1822–1942), British Conservative Party politician
Evelyn Ruggles-Brise (1857–1935), British prison administrator and reformer
Guy Ruggles-Brise (1914–2000), British Army officer, and High Sheriff of Essex
Harold Ruggles-Brise (1864–1927), British Army officer
John Ruggles-Brise (1908–2007), Lord Lieutenant of Essex
Samuel Ruggles-Brise (1825–1899), British Conservative Party politician

See also
Ruggles (surname)
Brise (disambiguation)

English-language surnames
Surnames of English origin